The 2009–10 Oklahoma Sooners men's basketball team represented the University of Oklahoma during the 2009–10 NCAA Division I men's basketball season. Their head coach was Jeff Capel, who was in his fourth year with the school. The team played its home games at the Lloyd Noble Center in Norman, OK with a capacity of 11,528 and are members of the Big 12 Conference. The Sooners finished the season 13–18, 4–12 in Big 12 play and lost in the first round of the 2010 Big 12 men's basketball tournament. They finished the season on a nine-game losing streak. All wins were subsequently vacated due to use of an ineligible player, Keith "Tiny" Gallon, who had received impermissible benefits.>

Pre-season
On April 19, 2009, Willie Warren announced that he would forgo the NBA draft and return of the 2009–10 season. In the offseason the Sooners lost seniors Omar Leary, Austin Johnson and Taylor Griffin and junior Blake Griffin. The younger Griffin was the number one pick in the 2009 NBA Draft while the elder Griffin was pick number 48. In the pre-season Big 12 coaches' poll, which is a poll of the current head coaches in the Big 12 and not to be confused with the Coaches Poll, the Sooners were picked to finish third. The Sporting News also named Warren their preseason Player of the Year.

Schedule

|- align="center" bgcolor="#D8FFEB"
| Ex.
| November 3
| British Columbia
| 93–53
| Willie Warren (23)
| Tiny Gallon (9)
| Willie Warren & Tommy Mason-Griffin (5)
| Lloyd Noble Center, Norman, OK8,246
|  
|- align="center" bgcolor="#D8FFEB"
| 1
| November 14
| Mount St. Mary's
| 95-71
| Steven Pledger (21)
| Tiny Gallon (15)
| Willie Warren (11)
| Lloyd Noble Center, Norman, OK10,490
| 1–0
|- align="center" bgcolor="#D8FFEB"
| 2
| November 17
| Louisiana–Monroe
| 72–61
| Willie Warren (24)
| Tiny Gallon (10)
| Tommy Mason-Griffin (5)
| Lloyd Noble Center, Norman, OK9,575
| 2–0
|- align="center" bgcolor="#FFE6E6"
| 3
| November 21
| VCU
| 69–82
| Tony Crocker (19)
| Tiny Gallon (11)
| Tommy Mason-Griffin (6)
| Stuart C. Siegel Center, Richmond, VA
| 2–1
|- align="center" bgcolor="#FFE6E6"
| 4
| November 25
| San Diego
| 64–76
| Willie Warren (30)
| Orlando Allen (7)
| Tommy Mason-Griffin (5)
| Sullivan Arena, Anchorage, AK
| 2–2
|- align="center" bgcolor="#FFE6E6"
| 5
| November 26
| Houston
| 93–100
| Willie Warren (25)
| Tony Crocker (10)
| Willie Warren (7)
| Sullivan Arena, Anchorage, AK
| 2–3
|- align="center" bgcolor="#D8FFEB"
| 6
| November 28
| Nicholls State
| 81–60
| Cade Davis (18)
| Tiny Gallon (12)
| Tommy Mason-Griffin (6)
| Sullivan Arena, Anchorage, AK
| 3–3
|-

|- align="center" bgcolor="#D8FFEB"
| 7
| December 2
| Arkansas
| 67–47
| Tony Crocker (16)
| Tony Crocker (16)
| Willie Warren (4)
| Lloyd Noble Center, Norman, OK10,612
| 4–3
|- align="center" bgcolor="#D8FFEB"
| 8
| December 6
| Arizona
| 67–47
| Willie Warren (25)
| Tiny Gallon (7)
| Tommy Mason-Griffin (6)
| Lloyd Noble Center, Norman, OK10,030
| 5–3
|- align="center" bgcolor="#D8FFEB"
| 9
| December 9
| Centenary College
| 86–62
| Tony Crocker (33)
| Tiny Gallon (15)
| Tommy Mason-Griffin (7)
| Lloyd Noble Center, Norman, OK9,456
| 6–3
|- align="center" bgcolor="#D8FFEB"
| 10
| December 12
| Utah
| 78–73 (OT)
| Willie Warren (27)
| Tony Crocker (10)
| Willie Warren (4)
| Jon M. Huntsman Center, Salt Lake City, UT9,268
| 7–3
|- align="center" bgcolor="#D8FFEB"
| 11
| December 19
| Northern Colorado
| 80–79
| Cade Davis (25)
| Tony Crocker (10)
| Tommy Mason-Griffin & Willie Warren (4)
| Lloyd Noble Center, Norman, OK10,528
| 8–3
|- align="center" bgcolor="#FFE6E6"
| 12
| December 21
| UTEP
| 74–89
| Willie Warren (26)
| Tiny Gallon & Tony Crocker (8)
| Willie Warren (4)
| Ford Center, Oklahoma City, OK
| 8–4
|- align="center" bgcolor="#FFE6E6"
| 13
| December 31
| #22 Gonzaga
| 69–83
| Willie Warren (19)
| Andrew Fitzgerald & Tiny Gallon (5)
| Tommy Mason-Griffin (10)
| Spokane Arena, Spokane, WA11,452
| 8–5
|-

|- align="center" bgcolor="#D8FFEB"
| 14
| January 4
| Maryland Eastern Shore
| 88–54
| Cade Davis (19)
| Tony Crocker & Tiny Gallon (12)
| Tommy Mason-Griffin (7)
| Lloyd Noble Center, Norman, OK9,402
| 9–5
|- align="center" bgcolor="#FFE6E6"
| 15
| January 9
| Baylor
| 60–91
| Tiny Gallon (17)
| Tiny Gallon & Willie Warren (5)
| Tony Crocker (5)
| Ferrell Center, Waco, TX8,757
| 9–6 (0–1)
|- align="center" bgcolor="#D8FFEB"
| 16
| January 11
| Oklahoma State
| 62–57
| Willie Warren (15)
| Tiny Gallon (18)
| Willie Warren (7)
| Lloyd Noble Center, Norman, OK11,143
| 10–6 (1–1)
|- align="center" bgcolor="#D8FFEB"
| 17
| January 16
| Missouri
| 66–61
| Willie Warren (21)
| Cade Davis (11)
| Willie Warren & Tommy Mason-Griffin (5)
| Lloyd Noble Center, Norman, OK12,384
| 11–6 (2–1)
|- align="center" bgcolor="#FFE6E6"
| 18
| January 19
| Texas A&M
| 62–65
| Tommy Mason-Griffin (21)
| Cade Davis & Tiny Gallon (7)
| Tommy Mason-Griffin (5)
| Reed Arena, College Station, TX11,109
| 11–7 (2–2)
|- align="center" bgcolor="#FFE6E6"
| 19
| January 23
| Texas Tech
| 65–75
| Tommy Mason-Griffin (28)
| Tony Crocker (13)
| Cade Davis (3)
| United Spirit Arena, Lubbock, TX10,408
| 11–8 (2–3)
|- align="center" bgcolor="#D8FFEB"
| 20
| January 27
| Iowa State
| 89–84
| Tommy Mason-Griffin (38)
| Ray Willis (7)
| Tommy Mason-Griffin (6)
| Lloyd Noble Center, Norman, OK9,468
| 12–8 (3–3)
|- align="center" bgcolor="#FFE6E6"
| 21
| January 30
| Nebraska
| 46–63
| Cade Davis (13)
| Ryan Wright (8)
| Tommy Mason-Griffin (4)
| Bob Devaney Sports Center, Lincoln, NE8,040
| 12–9 (3–4)
|-

|- align="center" bgcolor="#D8FFEB"
| 22
| February 6
| #10 Texas
| 71–80
| Thomas Mason-Griffin (24)
| Ryan Wright (14)
| Thomas Mason-Griffin (4)
| Lloyd Noble Center, Norman, OK12,036
| 13–9 (4–4)
|- align="center" bgcolor="#FFE6E6"
| 23
| February 9
| Texas Tech
| 71–72
| Willie Warren (18)
| Tony Crocker (11)
| Willie Warren (5)
| Lloyd Noble Center, Norman, OK10,323
| 13–10 (4–5)
|- align="center" bgcolor="#FFE6E6"
| 24
| February 13
| Oklahoma State
| 76–97
| Thomas Mason-Griffin (30)
| Ray Willis (7)
| Thomas Mason-Griffin (5)
| Gallagher-Iba Arena, Stillwater, OK12,380
| 13–11 (4–6)
|- align="center" bgcolor="#FFE6E6"
| 25
| February 17
| 
| 67–77
| Thomas Mason-Griffin & Willie Warren (19)
| Tiny Gallon (10)
| Tony Crocker & Thomas Mason-Griffin (3)
| Coors Events Center, Boulder, CO5,976
| 13–12 (4–7)
|- align="center" bgcolor="#FFE6E6"
| 26
| February 20
| #7 Kansas State
| 68–83
| Thomas Mason-Griffin (16)
| Tony Crocker (9)
| Thomas Mason-Griffin & Tony Crocker (5)
| Lloyd Noble Center, Norman, OK12,425
| 13–13 (4–8)
|- align="center" bgcolor="#FFE6E6"
| 27
| February 22
| #1 Kansas
| 68–81
| Thomas Mason-Griffin (17)
| Cade Daivs (8)
| Thomas Mason-Griffin (8)
| Allen Fieldhouse, Lawrence, KS16,300
| 13–14 (4–9)
|- align="center" bgcolor="#FFE6E6"
| 28
| February 27
| #24 Baylor
| 63–70
| Tiny Gallon (23)
| Tiny Gallon (15)
| Thomas Mason-Griffin (8)
| Lloyd Noble Center, Norman, OK7,894
| 13–15 (4–10)
|-

|- align="center" bgcolor="#FFE6E6"
| 29
| March 1
| Texas
| 76–87
| Tony Crocker (24)
| Tiny Gallon (9)
| Thomas Mason-Griffin (7)
| Frank Erwin Center, Austin, TX16,012
| 13–16 (4–11)
|- align="center" bgcolor="#FFE6E6"
| 30
| March 6
| #23 Texas A&M
| 54–69
| Thomas Mason-Griffin (16)
| Cade Davis (7)
| Cade Davis & Thomas Mason-Griffin (4)
| Lloyd Noble Center, Norman, OK11,074
| 13–17 (4–12)
|- align="center" bgcolor="#FFE6E6"
| 31
| March 10
| Oklahoma StateBig 12 tournament
| 67–81
| Thomas Mason-Griffin (22)
| Tiny Gallon, Tony Crocker, & Cade Davis (6)
| Thomas Mason-Griffin (9)
| Sprint Center, Kansas City, MO18,879
| 13–18

Roster

Rankings

References 

Oklahoma Sooners men's basketball seasons
Oklahoma